Bucculatrix quinquenotella is a species of moth of the family Bucculatricidae. It is found in North America, including Kentucky, Ohio, Michigan, Missouri, Iowa, Tennessee, Georgia, South Carolina, North Carolina, Washington D.C., New Jersey, Massachusetts, New Hampshire, Ontario, Quebec and Nova Scotia. It was described in 1875 by Vactor Tousey Chambers.

The wingspan is 7–8 mm. The forewings are pale ocherous to dark brownish ocherous, with brilliant silvery marks. The hindwings are pale brownish or reddish ocherous to dark fuscous. Adults have been recorded on wing from June to July.

The larvae feed on Ampelopsis species.

References

Moths described in 1875
Bucculatricidae
Moths of North America